Family Man is the third studio album by the American hardcore punk band Black Flag. Released in 1984 through SST Records, it features spoken word tracks by vocalist Henry Rollins and jazz-indebted instrumental tracks. It is also the first album to feature bassist Kira Roessler. "Armageddon Man" is the only track on the album in which Rollins and the instruments are together.

The album, along with spoken word recordings by Jello Biafra following the break-up of Dead Kennedys, is credited for introducing "alternative" spoken word to a larger audience.

Music and composition
The album features one LP side of spoken word performances from Henry Rollins and another of instrumental music from the Black Flag lineup of guitarist Greg Ginn, bassist Kira Roessler and drummer Bill Stevenson. AllMusic's Pemberton Roach, who described the record as Black Flag's most "experimental", compared the spoken word material to  Jim Morrison's works on live The Doors releases. AllAboutJazz's Trevor Maclaren stated: "It opens three points of interest: Rollins as the Beat Poet—sort of—the stoned dirge influence of Black Sabbath, and the instrumental jazz driven metal/punk that Ginn would utilize after dissolving Black Flag." Maclaren also added: "The distorted guitars and atonal feedback of players like Sonny Sharrock and James Blood Ulmer reign supreme in a sludgy Black Sabbath riff."

Cover art
The cover art, which was created by Raymond Pettibon, pictures a man holding a gun to his own head, while his wife and kids lie slaughtered nearby. The caption on the cover of reads: November 23rd, 1963.

Critical reception

AllMusic critic Pemberton Roach wrote: "Although sounding at times like a high-school garage band attempting to perform Rush covers, Ginn and company play with a sense of desperation and punk rock fury that makes much of the music positively electrifying." Roach also added: "Overall, Family Man is an essential, if atypical, part of the Black Flag canon and should appeal to fans of Sun Ra, Ornette Coleman, or the New York "noise" scene as well." All About Jazz's Trevor Maclaren stated that "for those who seek a real adventure and think that Last Exit was perhaps too extreme, Black Flag's Family Man and The Process of Weeding Out are choice lost gems."

Track listing

Personnel
Henry Rollins – vocals
Greg Ginn – guitar
Kira Roessler – bass
Bill Stevenson – drums
Raymond Pettibon – artwork

Charts

References

External links
 

Black Flag (band) albums
1984 albums
Albums produced by Spot (producer)
SST Records albums